Mbole is a Bantu language of the Democratic Republic of the Congo.
It is spoken by the Mbole people, with a population of about 100,000 as of 1971 living in the Tshopo District, southwest of Kisangani in the Democratic Republic of the Congo.

References

Mbole-Enya languages
Languages of the Democratic Republic of the Congo